"Blinded by Your Grace, Pt. 2" is a song by English rapper Stormzy featuring British singer MNEK. It was released on 27 October 2017 as the fourth single from his debut studio album, Gang Signs & Prayer, where its first part is placed in the track listing. It was written by the rapper himself, and produced by Fraser T. Smith. The single peaked at number seven on the UK Singles Chart, becoming his second highest-charting single behind "Big for Your Boots", the lead single from the LP released back in February 2017.

Music video
The music video for the single was uploaded via Stormzy's YouTube channel on 17 December 2017, and has over 34 million views as of October 2022.

Track listing

Charts

Weekly charts

Year-end charts

Certifications

References

2017 songs
2017 singles
Stormzy songs
MNEK songs
Songs written by Stormzy
Christianity in music
Song recordings produced by Fraser T. Smith